Burning Flipside (or Flipside) is an annual effigy burn, display of creative arts, and self-expression of performances staged in Central Texas near Austin. Modeled on and associated with Burning Man, Flipside was the first regional Burning Man event.

Lasting five days during the Memorial Day weekend, it is significantly smaller than Burning Man, with 3131 tickets sold in 2022, compared to about 80,000 participants for Burning Man. Participants build a temporary city called Pyropolis; all of the structures in this city are dismantled and removed at the end of the event. The main structure, the "effigy", is burned the last night, as are many other pieces of art around Flipside.

Organisation
The limited liability company which sells the tickets to Flipside, Austin Artistic Reconstruction, LLC prohibits all commercial use of photographs, video, film or any other medium taken at Burning Flipside without written permission. Therefore, media from Flipside is inherently non-free content. This prohibition on commercial use of imagery appeared as early as 1999.

Principles
Many of the core values of Burning Flipside are borrowed from Burning Man, and Flipside uses the same terms, namely:

 No Spectators. Every attendee is expected to participate in some way for the event, with a performance, art piece, other form of creative expression, or volunteering to help.
 Radical Self-Expression. Art and gatherings at the event have few restrictions; and can emphasize taboo subjects and dangerous situations.
 Self-reliance. All participants are responsible for their own food, shelter, water, and other necessities at the event.
 No Vending. Flipside is a non-commercial event; sales of any commodity (the one exception being ice) for cash is not allowed and may cause eviction from the event. Instead, a gift economy is used. Giving one gift in exchange for another is considered good form, but any kind of quid pro quo is a violation of the gift-economy rules
 Leave No Trace. An extension of the self-reliance principle applied to outdoor living, requiring all participants to respect their environment and clean up everything they bring in. Participants try to leave the site cleaner than they found it rather than in an identical condition.

Art Installations—Flipside community members bring art to the event for display, including large free-standing works, fire art, and interactive pieces.

Theme camps—Groups of participants who build a structure or area for public entertainment with an underlying theme. (Example: Casineaux Camp - A camp with a Casino Theme with real gambling style games, but using donated prizes and fake coins.)

Performances—Flipside has a number of performance spaces that are used by musicians, theatre groups, DJs, fire performers, pageants, and interactive performances.

Differences from Burning Man
Similar to Burning Man's Black Rock Rangers, the Pyropolis Rangers mediate disputes and maintain security at the event; they wear a similar khaki uniform, and attempt to be non-intrusive to other participants. Unlike Burning Man, however, the event is not regularly patrolled by law enforcement, although they arrive quickly in the event of an emergency.

Flipside has some other differences from Burning Man. Flipside's location is in a private camp area in the wooded, grassy Texas Hill Country, unlike the extremely flat, very dusty dried lake bed in Black Rock Desert where Burning Man is held. The Texas Hill Country features creeks, swimming holes, and tree-covered groves that make camping a more comfortable experience than the harsh high Nevada desert. Flipside is slightly more strict about the vending rule: the only thing sold is ice. The smaller size of the event creates a sense that one could meet everyone, as part of a temporary community that encompasses all the event participants. Almost every participant of Flipside, including the event's organizers, pay to get in regardless of how much time they put in volunteering. The only exceptions Austin Artistic Reconstruction makes are four free tickets: two to the designer of the sticker, and two to the designer of the ticket.

Additionally, unlike Burning Man where the central effigy of a glowing neon man stays essentially unaltered from year to year (with alteration to its base and other design elements), the Flipside effigy changes radically with each event. For example, participants built and burned a 6-armed, cowboy hat-wearing Hanuman effigy in 2004, a rocket ship at the 2005 event, and a chalice at the 2006 event.

Event history 
"Burning Man Texas" was held in June 1998 by George Paap. It had 30 attendees, and featured the burning of a straw man built on site. Burning Flipside (named by Melody Byrd in Prost's backyard) began in 1999.

From 1998 through 2005, the event was held at Recreation Plantation, a private campground in neighboring Dripping Springs, Texas. Having outgrown that space, the event moved to a larger property in 2006, Flat Creek Crossing. While this location allowed for potential future growth, the land is also more primitive,  due to the presence of large cliffs, scorpions, mountain lions, and other hazards, some believe that the land is more dangerous than even the Black Rock Desert. In 2010, the event moved to Apache Pastures near San Gabriel, Texas and Rockdale, Texas. The endemic pecan trees offered shade and participant created trails provided access to the San Gabriel River, a larger body of water than was present at Flat Creek Crossing.

See also 
 List of regional Burning Man events

References

External links 
 

Burning Man
Festivals in Texas